Man on the Tracks is a 1956 film by Andrzej Munk.

Man on the Tracks was one of the first films of the Polish Film School and as such influenced the whole generation of young directors who participated in the movement.

The film tells the story, mostly in flashback, of a railway worker who is fired from his job for alleged sabotage of the Socialist methods of work.

Historian Dorota Niemitz writes:

Cast
 Kazimierz Opaliński - Władysław Orzechowski
 Zygmunt Maciejewski - Tuszka
 Zygmunt Zintel - Witold Sałata
 Zygmunt Listkiewicz - Stanisław Zapora
 Roman Kłosowski - Marek Nowak
 Janusz Bylczyński - Warda, member of the committee 
 Józef Para - railwayman
 Natalia Szymańska - wife of Orzechowski
 Józef Nowak - helper of Orzechowski
 Janusz Paluszkiewicz - Krokus, a mechanic
 Leon Niemczyk - man on the platform
 Stanisław Jaworski - Franek, a friend of Orzechowski

See also 
 Cinema of Poland
 List of Polish-language films

Footnotes

Sources 
Niemitz, Dorota. 2014. The legacy of postwar Polish filmmaker Andrzej Munk. World Socialist Web Site. 13 October, 2014. https://www.wsws.org/en/articles/2014/10/13/munk-o13.html Retrieved 08 July, 2022.

External links
 

1950s Polish-language films
Rail transport films
1957 films
Films directed by Andrzej Munk
1957 drama films
Polish drama films